Kasperi Torikka (born April 8, 1999) is a Finnish professional ice hockey defenceman currently playing for SaiPa of the Finnish Liiga.

Torikka made his Liiga debut for SaiPa during the 2016-17 Liiga season where he played three games during the regular season. In the 2018–19 season, Torikka had loan spells with Mestis teams Ketterä and SaPKo.

Career statistics

References

External links

1999 births
Living people
Finnish ice hockey defencemen
Imatran Ketterä players
People from Ristiina
SaiPa players
SaPKo players
Sportspeople from South Savo